The old hymn and jazz tune "When the Saints Go Marching In" is used by a number of teams in various sports.  It may be used as the team's theme song or reserved for when they scored. Liverpool fans used it as a football chant to honour their player Ian St John in the 1960s, a song that was also adopted by other clubs.  Southampton Football Club, for example, use it as a football chant due to the fact that their nickname is The Saints, other football clubs use different variations of the song. It may be used with the standard lyrics, specialized lyrics, or no lyrics at all. When sung by a crowd, it is often started at a very slow tempo, around 70 beats per minute. The next verse is then dramatically sped up to somewhere around 140 beats per minute. 

The following is a partial list of its notable uses.

Teams-clubs

American football
New Orleans Saints (New Orleans, Louisiana)
Baylor University (Waco, Texas) Also serves as a fight song for Baylor's other sports teams
Brigham Young University (Provo, Utah) Played by school's marching band during its pre-game show

Australian rules football
St Kilda Football Club  (Melbourne, Victoria)

Association football
In various varieties of professional football, the teams using it include (in alphabetical order):
Aberdeen F.C. (Aberdeen, Scotland) substituting "Reds" for "Saints" and "steaming" for "marching"
Adelaide United (Adelaide, Australia) substituting "Reds" for "Saints"
AIK Stockholm (Stockholm, Sweden)
Aldershot Town (Aldershot, England) substituting "Shots" for "Saints" and "steaming" for "marching"
Alvechurch FC (Alvechurch, England) substituting "Church" for "saints"
Royal Antwerp FC (Antwerp, Belgium) substituting "Reds" (the club’s nickname) for "Saints"
Atlético Ottawa (Ottawa, Ontario, Canada) substituting "Atleti" for "saints"
Bengaluru FC (Bengaluru, India) substituting "Blues" for "Saints"
Birmingham City F.C. (Birmingham, England) substituting "Blues" for "Saints"
Bristol Rovers F.C. (Bristol, England) substituting "Gas!" for "Saints"
Chelsea F.C. (London, England) substituting "Blues" for "Saints" and "steaming" for "marching"
Colorado Rapids (Denver, Colorado, United States) substituting "Rapids" for "Saints"
Chalfont St Peter  (Buckinghamshire, England) 
Detroit City F.C. (Detroit, Michigan, United States) substituting "Le Rouge" (the club's nickname) for "Saints"
Djurgårdens IF (Stockholm, Sweden) Supporter group "Blue Saints"
Drogheda United F.C. (Drogheda, Ireland )substituting "Drogs" (the club's nickname) for "Saints"
Dundee United F.C. (Dundee, Scotland) substituting "Shed" (the name of United's most famous stand) for "Saints"
Fulham F.C. (London, England) substituting "Whites" (the club's nickname) for "Saints"
Hellas Verona F.C. (Verona, Italia) substituting "e quando i blu saranno in ciel"
Heart of Midlothian F.C. (Edinburgh, Scotland) substituting "Hearts" for "Saints"
India national football team by their supporting group Blue Pilgrims, substituting "Blues" for "Saints"
Inverness Caledonian Thistle F.C. (Inverness, Scotland) Use the melody but with new lyrics: "We've got a bridge and a castle" is sung three times, followed by "Inverness is wonderful"
Leeds United A.F.C. (Leeds, England) 
Leicester City F.C. (Leicester, England) substituting "Blues" (the team colour) for "Saints"
Liverpool F.C. (Liverpool, Merseyside, England) substituting "Reds" (the team colour) for "Saints".  It may, however, originally have been introduced by fans to honour Ian St John (in recognition of the "Saint" in his name), one of their star players of the 1960s.
Luton Town (Luton, Bedfordshire, England) substituting "Town" for "Saints" and "steaming" for "marching"
Maidstone United F.C. (Maidstone, Kent, England) substituting “Stones” for “Saints”
Manchester United F.C. (Greater Manchester, England)
Middlesbrough F.C. (Middlesbrough, England) 
Minnesota United F.C. (Saint Paul, Minnesota, United States) substituting "Minnesota" (the state name) for "Number" as well as substituting "Loons" (the club's nickname) for "Saints"
MK Dons (Milton Keynes, England) substituting "Dons" for "Saints"
Newcastle United Football Club  (Newcastle upon Tyne, England) substituting "Mags" (the club's nickname) for "Saints"
New England Revolution (Foxborough, Massachusetts, United States) substituting "Revs" (the club's nickname) for "Saints"
Norwich City F.C. (Norwich, England)
Oldham Athletic F.C. (Oldham, England) substituting "Blues" (the club's colour) for "Saints." A Dixieland version is used.
Peterborough United F.C. (Peterborough, England) substituting "Posh" for "Saints" and "steaming" for "marching" 
Portland Thorns FC (Portland, Oregon) substituting "Thorns" for "Saints"
Queens Park Rangers F.C. (London, England) substituting "R's" for "Saints" 
Palmeiras SE (São Paulo, Brazil)
Persija Jakarta (Jakarta, Indonesia) substituting "Oh Persija Jaya Raya"
Pittsburgh Riverhounds SC (Pittsburgh, Pennsylvania, United States) substituting "Hounds" for "Saints"
Rochdale A.F.C. (Rochdale, England) substituting "Dale" for "Saints".
Rotherham United F.C. (Rotherham, Yorkshire, England)
San Jose Earthquakes (San Jose, California, United States) substituting "Quakes" (the club's nickname) for "Saints"
Sheffield United F.C. (Sheffield, Yorkshire, England) substituting "Blades" (the club's nickname) for "Saints"
SK Brann (Bergen, Norway). Use the melody with different lyrics, sung in Norwegian. An English translation is "The city of Bergen is beautiful, and we have the best beer and tits".
Southampton F.C. (Southampton, England). The club is nicknamed "The Saints"
St. John's University (New York City, New York, United States) substituting "Storm" (from the team's nickname "the Red Storm") for "Saints"
St Johnstone Football Club (Perth, Scotland)
St Mirren Football Club (Paisley, Scotland) The club is nicknamed "The Saints"
St. Patrick's Athletic Football Club (Dublin, Ireland)
Swindon Town F.C. (Swindon, Wiltshire, England) substituting "Reds" (the team's home colour) for "Saints", and "steaming" for "marching" (due to the town's railway heritage)
Toronto F.C. (Toronto, Ontario, Canada) substituting "Reds" (the club's nickname) for "Saints"
Tottenham Hotspur F.C. (London, England) substituting "Spurs" (the club's nickname) for "Saints"
United States national soccer teams (United States) substituting "Yanks" for "Saints"
Vancouver Whitecaps FC (Vancouver, British Columbia, Canada) substituting "Caps" for "Saints"
West Bromwich Albion F.C. (West Midlands, England) substituting "Stripes" for "Saints"
Wolverhampton Wanderers F.C (West Midlands ,England) substituting “Wolves” for “Saints”
Real Club Celta de Vigo (Vigo, Galicia, Spain)

Rugby

Rugby Union
Northampton Saints (Northampton, England)

Rugby league
St George Illawarra Dragons (Kogarah (Sydney) and Wollongong, New South Wales, Australia)
St Helens R.F.C. (St. Helens, England)

Other sports
In ice hockey:
 It is played by the St. Louis Blues of the NHL when the team scores as well as at the beginning of the game and at the end of each period. Its use stems from the first years of the Blues, as initially the strongest of the NHL's late-1960s expansion teams, and was sung by fans as "When the Blues go marching in..." Sometimes, Blues fans change verses to "Oh when the Cup comes to St. Lou/ Oh when the Cup comes to St. Lou/ Oh Lord I want to be in that number/ When the Blues come marching in." Charles Glenn, the Blues national anthem singer, also sings this song with the crowd. 
 Whenever the Saints score a goal at St. Lawrence University, the crowd will sing "When the Saints Go Marching In" immediately after the goal is announced. A skating saint sign at each end of the arena flashes as well.

It is the college basketball fight song of, among others:
Providence College (Providence, Rhode Island, United States)
Saint Joseph's University (Philadelphia, Pennsylvania, United States)
Saint Louis University (St. Louis, Missouri, United States)

In college basketball, it is chanted by the University of Oregon student section (the Oregon Pit Crew), replacing "Saints" with "Ducks".

It is often played by the pep band during breaks in play. However, none of these teams use a true Dixieland version, but a version more suited to a college fight song.

It is played by St. Mary's School Yala, a high school in Kenya.

At the 1984 Summer Olympics singer Etta James performed the song during the opening ceremonies.

Versions

St Kilda Saints Football Club version lyrics
This has been in use since the 1970s by the St. Kilda Saints Football Club. The version of the song was recorded by the Fable Singers by permission under license and only mentions the St. Kilda Football Club. The Official St. Kilda Football Club song is played at the ground when the St. Kilda Football Club Players run out before a game and after a St. Kilda victory in the Australian Football League, followed by a hearty rendition of the song by the players in the rooms after the match (it is broadcast by permission).

 Oh when the Saints, go marching in,
 Oh when the Saints go marching in,
 Oh how I want to be with St Kilda,
 Oh when the Saints go marching in.

 Oh when the Saints (Oh when the Saints), go marching in (go marching in),
 Oh when the Saints go marching in,
 Oh how I want to be with St Kilda, 
 Oh when the Saints go marching in.

St George Illawarra Dragons
Often sung by the parochial supporters of the Dragons (dubbed the "Dragon Army"), the version of the song used is very similar to St Kilda's. This version does, however, remain loyal to the original, with the third line of both stanzas being "I wanna be in that number". On rare occasion, further verses are sung by the "Dragon Army".

Providence College Friars
Saints was not originally used, but rather Friar Away, a typical college fight song. However, in the 1950s, a local radio station (WPRO-AM) began using it as the theme music to their coverage of Providence College basketball games. The fans took to it so well that it has become the fight song of the college, with Friar Away slipping into obscurity, save for a brief revival in the late 1990s.

References

Sporting songs
Football songs and chants